Safety Dunce is an instrumental metal and hard rock solo album released by former Five Finger Death Punch guitarist Jason Hook in 2007. The album title is an obvious play on words of the song "The Safety Dance" by Men Without Hats. Safety Dunce won a 2007 L.A. Music Award for Best Instrumental Record.

The album's percussion was provided by former Five Finger Death Punch drummer Jeremy Spencer who also co-produced the album with Hook.

Track listing

There is a six-song version and a nine-song version.

6-song version
 Body Bag
 Number Three
 Slow Motion Walter
 Beaucoup Movement
 Safety Dunce
 Limited Audience

9-song version
 Body Bag
 Number Three
 Love Flap Candy Corn
 Beaucoup Movement
 Limited Audience
 Slow Motion Walter
 Wider Audience
 Safety Dunce
 Patience Tester

References

External links
Hook's official website

Jason Hook albums
2007 albums